Sara Varone  (born 27 December 1972) is an Italian television host.

In 2006 her TV first appearance on Mediaset main channel Canale 5 in the Sunday afternoon show ‘’’Buona Domenica’’’ hosted by Paola Perego. In the show together with Elisabetta Gregoraci held a regular session devoted to “Gossip”. She remained part of the cast until 2009.

In 2009 she acted in “Airplane”  (a theater adaptation of the movie). 
And in 2010 in the  play “Un giorno lungo quarant'anni” with Gianfranco D'Angelo.

Additional 
Earned a BS degree in Psychology at La Sapienza university in  Rome with the goal to become a sexual psychologist.

References

External links

1972 births
Living people
Italian female models
Mass media people from Rome